Catalina Margarita López Ramos (June 21, 1924 – July 4, 2005), known professionally as Marga López, was an Argentine-born Mexican actress.

Biography
Born Catalina Margarita López Ramos in June 21st, 1924 in San Miguel de Tucumán, Argentina. Even though she was born in Argentina, she later acquired Mexican citizenship. Her parents were Pedro López Sánchez and Dolores Ramos Nava. She had six siblings: Juan, Miguel, Dolores, Pedro, María and Manuel. She debuted in show business in her home country as a child, with her siblings, in the group known as Los Hermanitos López.

In 1936, the group journeyed through Latin America including Mexico. There she met her future husband Carlos Amador, a cinema producer, whom she married twice, in 1941 and in 1961. They had two children, Carlos and Manuel. In 1964, she married actor Arturo de Córdova, who died in 1973. They acted together in Sinful. She was the sister of the outstanding guitarist, concert guitarist and teacher Manuel López Ramos, founder of Estudio de Arte Guitarrístico and considered a pioneer in the teaching of classical guitar in Mexico.

Her debut in Mexican cinema was in the role of a waitress in the film El hijo desobediente, directed by Humberto Gómez Landero, in 1945. Later in 1959, she shared the big screen with Rita Macedo in Nazarín a film by Luis Buñuel. She appeared in more than 80 movies in the Golden Age of the Cinema of Mexico, sharing credits with Pedro Infante, Luis Aguilar, Ernesto Alonso, Tin Tan and Amparo Rivelles. She also appeared in many telenovelas, her last one being Bajo la misma piel.

In 2004 she was present at The Chamizal Independent Film Festival (Fourth Chamizal Independent Film Festival), in El Paso, Texas and in Ciudad Juárez, Chihuahua. A lifetime of hard work, international recognition and many acting achievements, her most notably are Salón México and Nazarín (1958), co-starring with Ignacio López Tarso.

Death

By 2005, she was an emphysema patient and had acute episodes of bronchitis. Reportedly, she was a chain smoker and did not give up tobacco until 2004. On Tuesday, 19 April 2005, she suffered a heart attack while undergoing a health check-up test at a hospital in Mexico City. She died on July 4, 2005, from cardiac arrhythmia.

Telenovelas
 Bajo la misma piel (2003-2004) as Esther Escalante de Ortiz.
 Entre el amor y el odio (2002) as Josefa Villarreal.
 El manantial (2001-2002) como Madre Superiora.
 Aventuras en el tiempo (2001) as Urraca Valdepeña.
 Carita de ángel (2001) como Madre General Asunción de la Lúz.
 La casa en la playa (2000) as Serena Rivas.
 El privilegio de amar (1998-1999) as Ana Joaquina Velarde.
 Mujer, casos de la vida real (1997) (Episodio: ¿Qué está pasando?)
 Te sigo amando (1996-1997) as Montserrat.
 Lazos de amor (1995-1996) as Mercedes Iturbe. 
 Alondra (1995) as Leticia del Bosque. †
 La hora marcada (1989) as Martha
 Caminemos (1980) como Aurora. 
 Añoranza (1979) as Magdalena.
 Ven conmigo (1975) 
 El juramento (1974) 
 Las máscaras (1971) as Márgara.
 Concierto de almas (1969) as Magda.
 Cynthia (1968) as Cynthia.
 Las momias de Guanajuato (1962)

Selected filmography

The Disobedient Son (1945)
Los tres García (The Three Garcías) (1946)
Vuelven los García (The Garcías Return) (1946)
Cartas marcadas (Marked Cards) (1947)
Music Inside (1947)
Salón México (1949)
 Midnight (1949)
 Love for Love (1950)
 Arrabalera (1951)
 Girls in Uniform (1951)
 A Place Near Heaven (1952)
 Now I Am Rich (1952)
 A Divorce (1953)
 My Darling Clementine (1953)
Los gavilanes (The Sparrowhawks) (1954)
La tercera palabra (The Third Word) (1955)
Del brazo y por la calle (Arm in Arm Down the Street) (1956)
Nazarín (1958)
 Alfonso XII and María Cristina (1960)
 My Mother Is Guilty (1960)
 Peaches in Syrup (1960)
Hasta el viento tiene miedo (1968)
El libro de piedra (1969)

References

External links

 
 

1924 births
2005 deaths
Ariel Award winners
Deaths from emphysema
Mexican film actresses
Mexican telenovela actresses
Golden Age of Mexican cinema
Golden Ariel Award winners
Argentine emigrants to Mexico
Naturalized citizens of Mexico
People from San Miguel de Tucumán
Actresses from Mexico City